Mohammad Hanif may refer to:

 Muhamed Haneef (born 1979), Indian physician who was wrongly accused of aiding terrorists
 Mohammad Hanif (clan leader)
 Mohammad Hanif (cricketer), Pakistani cricketer who played for Pakistan Air Force
 Mohammad Hanif (mayor) (died 2006), mayor of Dhaka during 1994 to 2002
 Mohammad Hanif (scholar) (fl. 1980s), inventor of the Hanifi Rohingya script
 Muhammad Hanif (Taliban spokesperson) (died 2008), spokesman for Afghan Taliban
 Muhammad Hanif Qureshi (1877–1938),  South Asian Muslim poet
 Mohammed Hanif (born 1964), British Pakistani writer and journalist
 Mohammad Hanif (Iranian writer) (born 1961), Iranian novelist and scholar
 Muhammad Hanif (Barista) (born 1997), Bangladeshi Boy

See also
 Hanif Mohammad (1934–2016), Pakistani cricketer